Songs and Advice for Kids Who Have Been Left Behind is a seven-song EP released by 1990s cult rock band The Stinkypuffs. Released in 1996, it was also their last. The band's frontman, Simon Fair Timony, said he based the songs on the release on what he felt and learned after Kurt Cobain's death.

Track listing
 "I Know I Know" 
 "The Vitamin Song" 
 "I'll Love You Anyway" (written about Kurt Cobain) 
 "Rubber Pen" 
 "The Three Tuners" 
 "Bummer Skit" 
 "Dream Weaver" (cover of Gary Wright hit)

References

External links 

1996 EPs
The Stinkypuffs albums
Elemental Records EPs